Kadeem D'Arby Coleby (born November 8, 1989), nicknamed KC,  is a Bahamian professional basketball player who plays for the Akita Northern Happinets of the B.League in Japan. He is the one of the league-leading skilled shot blockers.
He fractured both kneecaps during the game on February 10, 2021.

College statistics

|-
| style="text-align:left;"| 2009-10
| style="text-align:left;"| Odessa
| 30 ||  ||  || .330 ||  || .380|| 2.667 ||0.233  || 0.200 || 0.433 || 1.67
|-
| style="text-align:left;"| 2010-11
| style="text-align:left;"| Daytona State
| 32 ||  ||  || .530 ||  || .510|| 8.063 ||0.750  || 0.406 || 2.406 || 10.19
|-
| style="text-align:left;"| 2011-12
| style="text-align:left;"| Louisiana–Lafayette
| 31 || 30 || 24.4 || .561 || .000 || .500|| 4.9 ||0.8  || 0.4 || 2.4 || 9.5
|-
| style="text-align:left;"| 2013-14
| style="text-align:left;"| Wichita State
| 36 || 19 || 12.9 || .452 || .000 || .500|| 1.3 ||0.2  || 0.1 || 1.3 || 2.6
|-

Playoffs

|-
| style="text-align:left;"| 2013-14
| style="text-align:left;"| Wichita
| 2 ||  || 13.0 || .400 || .000 || .167|| 1.5 ||0  || 0 || 2.0 || 2.5
|-

Career statistics

Regular season 

|-
| align="left"  style="background-color:#afe6ba; border: 1px solid gray" | 2017†
| align="left" | Manama
|6 || || 26.8 ||68  || 0 ||73.5  || 8.8 || 1.3 || 1.0 ||1.83  || 15.5
|-
| align="left" | 2017-18
| align="left" | Akita
|51 ||31 || 21.7 ||58.1  || 0 ||61.2  || 6.7 || 1.0 || 1.0 ||bgcolor="CFECEC"|1.7*  || 11.9
|-
| align="left" | 2018-19
| align="left" | Akita
|52 ||52 ||30.5  || 53.9 || 0 || 57.4 || 8.4 ||1.4  ||1.1  || bgcolor="CFECEC"|2.3* || 12.8
|-
| align="left" | 2019-20
| align="left" | Akita
|34 ||34 ||27.2  || 54.1 || 0 || 65.0 || 6.9 ||1.2  ||0.8  || 1.9 || 10.1
|-
| align="left" | 2020-21
| align="left" | Akita
|35 ||35 ||26.5  || 64.6 || 0 || 60.5 || 7.9 ||2.4  ||1.1  || 1.6 || 12.3
|-

Playoffs 

|-
|style="text-align:left;"|2017-18
|style="text-align:left;"|Akita
| 5 || 3 || 19:54 || .600 || .000 || .800 || 3.2 || 0.2 || 1.2 || 1.4 || 9.6
|-

Early cup games 

|-
|style="text-align:left;"|2017
|style="text-align:left;"|Akita
| 2 || 1 || 20:15 || .636 || .000 || .556 || 6.0 || 0.5 || 3.0 || 2.0 || 9.5
|-
|style="text-align:left;"|2018
|style="text-align:left;"|Akita
|2 || 1 || 25:48 || .474 || .000 || .600 || 9.5 || 0.0 || 1.0 || 2.0 || 10.5
|-
|style="text-align:left;"|2019
|style="text-align:left;"|Akita
|2 ||2 || 24:31 || .471 || .000 || .143 || 9.0 || 3.5 || 0.5 || 1.0 || 8.5
|-

Preseason games

|-
| align="left" |2018
| align="left" | Akita
| 2 || 1 || 20.8 || .500 ||.000  || .688||4.0 || 1.5|| 0.5 || 0.5 ||  9.5
|-
| align="left" |2019
| align="left" | Akita
| 3 || 2 || 20.2 || .739 ||.000  || .429||4.3 || 2.7|| 0.3 || 2.0 ||  12.33
|-

Source: Changwon1Changwon2
Source: UtsunomiyaToyamaSendai

National team

|-
| align="left" | 2012
| align="left" | Bahamas
|4 || || 14.75 ||68.8  || 0 ||50 || 2.8 || 0 || 0 ||2.8  || 6.5
|-
| align="left" | 2014
| align="left" | Bahamas
|5 || || 25 ||48.9  || 0 ||66.7 || 4.2 || 0.8 || 0.8 ||1.2  ||10.8
|-
| align="left" | 2015
| align="left" | Bahamas
|5 || || 20.2 ||41.7  || 0 ||65 || 5.2 || 0.4 || 0 ||3.4  ||8.6
|-
| align="left" | 2018
| align="left" | Bahamas
|2 || || 21 ||45.5  || 0 ||85.7 || 3.5 || 1.0 ||0.5  || 2 ||8.0
|-

Personal
His younger brother, Dwight Coleby (tl) played college basketball for the University of Kansas and Western Kentucky. DC signed with the Liège Basket in Belgium, and was transferred to the Happinets. This KC/DC brother unit became successful in a 76-52 win to the Levanga Hokkaido on March 13, 2019. Their mother died at the age of 43, and KC wears #43. KC tied knot to Krystal Coleby on July 14, 2018.

External links
Wichita State Shockers bio
Kadeem Coleby: D1 Highlights (Junior and senior year)
Kadeem Coleby Highlights Vs Manama
Kadeem Coleby: National Team Highlights 2015
Kentucky vs Wichita State 2014, #20
RealGM Stats
Stats in Japan

References

1989 births
Living people
Akita Northern Happinets players
Bahamian men's basketball players
Centers (basketball)
Daytona State Falcons men's basketball players
Louisiana Ragin' Cajuns men's basketball players
Odessa Wranglers men's basketball players
Power forwards (basketball)
Sportspeople from Nassau, Bahamas
Wichita State Shockers men's basketball players